The 1986 FIA Formula One World Championship was the 40th season of FIA Formula One motor racing. It featured the 1986 Formula One World Championship for Drivers and the 1986 Formula One World Championship for Manufacturers, both of which commenced on 23 March and ended on 26 October after sixteen races. The Drivers' Championship was won by Alain Prost, and the Manufacturers' Championship was won by Williams-Honda, thus Honda became the first Japanese engine supplier World Champions of Formula One, and adding a constructors' title to Frank Williams' trophy collection. Prost was the first driver to win back-to-back Drivers' Championships since Jack Brabham in 1959 and 1960.

Season summary
The 1986 championship culminated in a battle between Williams drivers Nigel Mansell and Nelson Piquet and McLaren driver Alain Prost at the final race, the Australian Grand Prix. Mansell's tyre exploded and Piquet was brought in for a precautionary pit stop for tyres as a result, leaving Prost to win the race and his second consecutive Drivers' Championship. Mansell, Piquet and Prost, along with Lotus' Ayrton Senna, dominated throughout the season and formed what was dubbed as the "Gang of Four".

For the first time, turbocharged engines were compulsory due to a ban on naturally aspirated engines.

The Formula One cars of 1986 are the most powerful Grand Prix cars in history. There were still no limits on engine power, and some engines, including the powerful but rather unreliable BMW M12/13 1.5 litre single turbocharged straight-4 engine used by the Benetton, Brabham and Arrows teams, could throw out 1,350+ hp at 5.5 bar boost (79.7 psi) during qualifying; this would happen when the engineers took the boost restrictors off the engine. The power of the turbocharged engines was so great that it could not even be accurately measured until years later, when the dynamometer technology was advanced enough. Purpose-built drivetrains had to be fitted to the chassis of each car for specific sessions – there were qualifying engines (as described above) that had unrestricted boost pressure, and qualifying gearboxes, designed to withstand the engine's extra power; these components were pushed to their absolute structural limits and would only last about 3–4 minutes (2–3 laps) during use (hence the nickname "grenades"), and if pushed for too long, they would simply break. These drivetrain units were then taken out and then replaced with the boost-restricted engines and specifically prepared gearboxes for races, which had to be just powerful enough to last a race distance. One common sight of these cars going around the track was flames being quickly spit out of their exhausts during gear changes or when the driver lifted off the throttle.

When these turbocharged engines were fitted to the cars, the whole package weighed about 540 kg (1,190 lb). For qualifying, the power to weight ratios were about 2,500 hp/ton+ for the Benetton-BMW and 1,850 hp/ton for the Benetton's race trim; compared to about 1,175 hp/ton for a modern F1 car – and all Formula 1 cars had manual stick-shift gearboxes then. A consistent problem for these new turbo engines that was somewhat smoothed over (particularly by Ford and Honda) over the years was the turbo lag. In the engines, which were mechanically turbocharged, the power would only come on all at once 2–3 seconds after the driver put his foot down; it would usually measure out from 100 to 300 hp for the first 2–3 seconds then the engine would go immediately to the top of the power range (usually 900–1000 hp). The nature of these engines made them very difficult to drive; drivers had to anticipate when the power would come on, so they would floor the gas pedal much earlier than usual to get the power on at the right moment. This was similar to what had gone on in American IndyCar racing in the early 1970s.

The boost of the engines would often be restricted to the point where they would only be producing around 900–1,000 hp during the race. The major automotive manufacturers participating in F1 at the time, with their superior money and resources ran at the front of the turbocharged engine development race. The Honda twin-turbocharged V6 exclusively supplied to the Williams team were second to BMW in overall power and had slightly less power than the German engines; the Ferrari, TAG/Porsche, and Renault twin-turbocharged V6 engines were not as powerful and as efficient as the Honda and BMW engines, producing about 25–40 less horsepower than the Japanese and German powerplants. The new Ford-Cosworth turbocharged V6 (a successor to the ubiquitous DFV V8) was made in a rush and was therefore underpowered and underdeveloped; it apparently had 150–200 less horsepower than the front-running European and Honda engines; but continued development meant that this engine got considerably better in 1987. The underfunded and very unreliable Alfa Romeo, Motori Moderni, Zakspeed and Hart engines were considerably less powerful than any of the others and kept their users down the order frequently. The power  in engines from 1980 to 1986 doubled. In 1980, the most powerful engine was the Renault twin-turbo V6 engine, which produced between 550 and 600 horsepower; most teams were using naturally-aspirated Ford-Cosworth DFV V8 engines in 1980 that produced about 480–510 hp; although some of the turbo engine's power was negated by its heavier weight.

As a result, fuel consumption became a problem for most teams since the engines were slightly more powerful than before. There were many races where a number of drivers ran out of fuel, including Alain Prost at Hockenheim, who very nearly finished third but ran out of fuel less than 500 meters from the finishing line. He tried to push his stricken car across the finish line, ultimately never making it and finishing sixth. The Honda engines (second in power to the BMW engines) had the edge on fuel consumption and reliability, but the TAG/Porsche, Renault and BMW engineers were able to gain some ground later in the season.

The end of the 1986 season saw the retirements of two former World Champions,  champion Alan Jones and  champion Keke Rosberg, as well as Patrick Tambay. The careers of Jacques Laffite and Marc Surer also ended during 1986, both through serious injury: Laffite at the British Grand Prix, and Surer in a  rally crash in Germany following the Belgian Grand Prix. This was the only F1 season for both Johnny Dumfries and Allen Berg; Huub Rothengatter also dropped out of F1 at season's end. Elio de Angelis was killed in a testing accident at the Circuit Paul Ricard following the Monaco Grand Prix; he remained the last driver to die in F1 until Roland Ratzenberger at the 1994 San Marino Grand Prix.

The 1986 Formula One calendar featured the brand-new Hungarian Grand Prix, as well as the return of both the Mexican Grand Prix (last held in ) and the Spanish Grand Prix (last held in ). Exiting the calendar were the Dutch and South African Grands Prix, as well as the infrequently-run European Grand Prix.

Drivers and constructors
The following competitors contested the 1986 Formula One World Championship.

Calendar

On the provisional calendar:

Calendar changes
An early version of the 1986 calendar had 20 races.
An attempt was made to revive the Argentine Grand Prix at the Buenos Aires Autodrome to be held on 9 March as Round 1; this was unsuccessful due to lack of sponsorship and no Argentinian driver competing in the championship.
The Japanese Grand Prix, originally scheduled for 6 April on a provisional calendar was cancelled as rebuilding parts of the Suzuka Circuit were too time consuming. It would last another year for the race to be held at Suzuka.
The Spanish Grand Prix returned to the calendar for the first time in five years, but was moved from the Jarama circuit near Madrid to the newly built Circuito de Jerez in Andalusia after 2 aborted attempts in 1984 and 1985 to stage the race in Fuengirola.
The British Grand Prix was moved from Silverstone to Brands Hatch, in keeping with the event-sharing arrangement between the two circuits. The 1986 British Grand Prix would be the last at Brands Hatch as from 1987 the British Grand Prix would be permanently held at Silverstone under FISA's one country one circuit rule. 
The German Grand Prix returned to the Hockenheimring after using the Nürburgring for 1985, and would be permanently held at Hockenheim under FISA's one country one circuit rule.
The Dutch Grand Prix, originally scheduled for 31 August was dropped after CENAV (Circuit Exploitatie Nederlandse Autorensport Vereniging) who owned the circuit went out of business. It was replaced by the Hungarian Grand Prix.
The Belgian Grand Prix was moved to May, the 1985 race was scheduled for June but was moved to September of that year because of the track surface breaking after a resurfacing with asphalt designed to deal with wet conditions (common in the country) was destroyed by the power of the cars during the Friday practices (before the cancellation) and by unexpectedly hot and dry weather.
The Portuguese Grand Prix was moved from mid April to mid September.
The Mexican Grand Prix returned for the first time in 16 years. The Autódromo Hermanos Rodríguez in Mexico City was upgraded to a new layout to improve safety. The race was held on 12 October; the race was originally supposed to return in 1985 but was cancelled due to the 1985 Mexico City earthquake.
The South African Grand Prix, originally scheduled for 26 October was dropped due to apartheid. FISA banned all events in South Africa until 1992.
Originally, the Australian Grand Prix was due to take place on 9 November as the final round, but was moved back 2 weeks earlier to 26 October to replace the cancelled South African race.

Races description

Pre-season 
Most of the major teams changed at least one driver aside from Ferrari, who retained both Michele Alboreto and Stefan Johansson. McLaren hired Keke Rosberg from Williams to replace the retired Niki Lauda alongside Alain Prost, while Nelson Piquet left Brabham to take Rosberg's place alongside Nigel Mansell at Williams. Ayrton Senna stayed at Lotus but blocked the recruitment of Derek Warwick, the team signing Johnny Dumfries instead. Riccardo Patrese returned to Brabham, where he was joined by Elio de Angelis; Gordon Murray produced for the team the unusual BT55, which had the BMW engine tilted over to make the car very low to reduce aerodynamic drag. The Haas-Lola team expanded to two cars with Alan Jones joined by Patrick Tambay. Toleman was taken over by the Benetton clothing company and renamed accordingly; Teo Fabi was joined by Gerhard Berger, while the team also secured a supply of BMW engines. Marc Surer returned to Arrows to take Berger's place alongside Thierry Boutsen. The factory Renault team having closed, many of its staff moved to Ligier, where Jacques Laffite was joined by fellow French veteran René Arnoux. Tyrrell had landed backing from Data General and Courtaulds, and ran Martin Brundle and Philippe Streiff. Minardi expanded to two cars for Andrea de Cesaris and newcomer Alessandro Nannini, while Osella also ran two cars for Piercarlo Ghinzani and Christian Danner. Zakspeed continued to run one car for Jonathan Palmer.

Shortly before the season began, Frank Williams was involved in a road accident in France that left him in a wheelchair. Technical director and part-owner Patrick Head would be forced to run the team in all departments, in addition to his design and engineering work.

Race 1: Brazil
The first race of the season was in Brazil at the rough and abrasive Jacarepagua Riocentro Autodrome in the tropical heat of Rio de Janeiro. Lengthy test sessions there before the race weekend was often the case for the teams. Qualifying resulted in pole position for Senna, followed by the two Williams-Hondas of Nelson Piquet and Nigel Mansell, and by Rene Arnoux and Jacques Laffite in the two Ligier-Renaults. Sixth on the grid went to Michele Alboreto (Ferrari) ahead of Rosberg, Stefan Johansson (Ferrari) and Prost, with Riccardo Patrese completing the top 10 for Brabham.

The race day was very hot and humid. At the start Mansell tried to get ahead of Senna. The Brazilian refused to give way and Mansell went off into the barriers. Piquet then went past Senna on Lap 3 and took the lead, beginning to pull away at a second a lap; Senna remained ahead of Arnoux, although the Frenchman was soon overtaken by Alboreto. Rosberg was fifth but his engine would soon fail, leaving Johansson to take over. Prost made rapid progress and by lap 16 he had worked his way ahead of Johansson, Arnoux and Alboreto and was running third. On lap 19 Piquet pitted for new tyres and on the following lap Prost overtook Senna to go into the lead. Senna pitted, and dropped down the order. Piquet now charged back and retook the lead just before Prost stopped for tires and so the order settled again with Piquet leading Senna and Prost, although the McLaren driver soon went out with an engine failure. This put Arnoux third but he was a long way back and had Laffite on his tail while Dumfries was fifth. The Scotsman then ran into trouble with an electrical problem and pitted. Senna's tires were put on his car and then taken off again and he was sent on his way, with the electrical problem not having been fixed. Berger thus moved into fifth place. Both leaders pitted again but the order remained unchanged and Rio native Piquet duly won the race with São Paulo native Senna second, completing a Brazilian 1–2 at the Brazilian Grand Prix. Laffite got the better of Arnoux for third place, while fifth place went to Brundle, who had overtaken a troubled Berger in the closing laps.

Race 2: Spain
3 weeks after the Brazilian Grand Prix saw the return of the Spanish Grand Prix. There had not been a Spanish Grand Prix since the Madrid-based Jarama circuit hosted the race in 1981, but the local authorities in Jerez had built a new circuit and so the F1 trucks rolled down to southern Spain for the event. The circuit, located 1 hour south of Seville was in a desert and was located in the Costa del Sol, providing very pleasant weather for the event. The flat circuit was very modern, and had a number of long corners.

At the start, pole-sitter Senna took the lead and with Piquet second and Rosberg and Prost quickly getting ahead of Mansell. The Englishman then began to charge and he moved gradually back up to second place and on the 39th lap he overtook Senna to take the lead. Mansell then pulled out a four-second lead by Senna gradually reeled him in again, while Prost sat on his tail in his McLaren-TAG/Porsche, Piquet having gone out with engine trouble. With 10 laps to go Senna challenged for the lead but Mansell held him off. Senna was not going to be beaten and tried again at the hairpin at the back of the track. This time he made it through and Mansell had to lift off, which allowed the canny Prost to sneak into second place. Mansell decided to go for a desperate gamble. He pitted for fresh tires, emerging 20secs behind Senna with nine laps to go. Those were mighty laps as Mansell carved into Senna's lead at a rate of four seconds a lap. But ahead of him on the road was Prost – and he was not going to give up without a fight. Mansell was able to pass Prost but he was 0.7s slower on that lap than Senna. Mansell took up the chase again and as they set off on the last lap the pair were separated by only a second and a half. At the hairpin Mansell was right with Senna but there was nothing he could do through the next few corners. It was all going to be down to the acceleration out of the last corner. The Williams-Honda was quicker but Senna got to the line first, the two cars side by side, separated by 0.014secs. It was the second closest finish in F1 history to that point, behind only the 1971 Italian Grand Prix. Prost was third with Rosberg fourth, Fabi fifth and Berger sixth.

Race 3: San Marino (Imola, Italy)
The San Marino Grand Prix, not held in the tiny principality of San Marino (which didn't have a race track) but at the Autodromo Dino Ferrari in Imola, Italy; just outside of Bologna near the Ferrari headquarters. The circuit had been updated with new safety features, including the demolishing of a house for more runoff area at the fast corner near the two Rivazza corners. Senna was on pole ahead of the two Williams-Hondas of Nelson Piquet and Nigel Mansell. The McLaren of Alain Prost was ahead of Michele Alboreto's Ferrari with Keke Rosberg (McLaren), Stefan Johansson (Ferrari) and the Ligier-Renault of Rene Arnoux next up. The top 10 was completed by the Benetton-BMWs of Gerhard Berger and Teo Fabi while Patrick Tambay was 11th in his Lola-Hart. The Imola circuit was the most demanding circuit of the year for fuel consumption, and this race was to be a real test of patience and strategy for the teams and drivers. Senna took the lead at the start with Piquet behind him but Mansell had an engine problem and dropped back behind Prost and Rosberg. On the fourth lap Prost and Rosberg both overtook Senna but then Rosberg passed his teammate to take second place. Alboreto was fourth while Senna disappeared with a wheelbearing failure. This meant that Fabi and Berger were fifth and sixth, although the Austrian soon overtook the Italian. During the pit stops Prost's crew did a better job and he took the lead when Rosberg pitted on lap 33. Keke's stop was slow and he rejoined second. The order then settled with Piquet having to watch his mirrors for Alboreto while he conserved fuel. Finally he had enough fuel to race again. Alboreto faded and disappeared later with a turbo problem. Piquet caught Rosberg but the McLaren seemed to be able to hold him off until Rosberg ran out of petrol. Riccardo Patrese, up to fourth in his Brabham, also stopped and this meant that Gerhard Berger found himself in third at the finish behind Prost and Piquet. Johansson was fourth with Rosberg and Patrese classified fifth and sixth.

Race 4: Monaco
There was a new chicane at Monaco, the track having been extended out over the harbor to create a much slower kink than had previously been the case. The only change to the entry was that Patrick Tambay had a new Ford turbo engine in the back of his Beatrice Lola for the first time. Qualifying resulted in pole position for Prost, with Mansell, and Senna behind him. Then came Michele Alboreto's Ferrari and the improving Benetton-BMW of Gerhard Berger. The Brabham-BMW BT55 seemed to be getting better as well with Riccardo Patrese sixth ahead of Jacques Laffite's Ligier-Renault, Tambay, Rosberg and Martin Brundle in the Tyrrell-Renault. The biggest surprise in qualifying was Johnny Dumfries's failure to qualify the second Lotus-Renault. Laffite had to start from the back of the grid because he was not ready when the field set off for the final parade lap. The start was incident free and the top 10 then remained unchanged for the first few laps with Prost leading Senna, Mansell, Alboreto, a fast-starting Rosberg and Berger. The Austrian fell behind Patrese on lap 10 and on lap 16 Rosberg overtook Alboreto. He followed this up by overtaking Mansell on lap 26 and the Englishman then pitted for new tires, which dropped him to fifth behind Alboreto. Patrese blew his chances by stalling during his pit stop. When the pits stops were over Prost led Rosberg and Senna. Mansell was fourth. Alboreto retired with a turbo failure and Berger went out with a hub problem. Further back there was a dramatic accident when Brundle and Tambay collided at Mirabeau, the Beatrice Lola somersaulting into the barriers. Both cars were out. The order at the front did not change, however, and so Prost won from Rosberg with Senna third, Mansell fourth and the Ligiers of Arnoux and Laffite fifth and sixth.

Death of Elio de Angelis
In the fortnight between Monaco and Belgium, there was a test at Paul Ricard and a rear wing failure on his Brabham caused Elio de Angelis to crash. The car cartwheeled over the barriers and landed upside down. The ill-equipped marshals were unable to turn it over and a fire broke out. This was put out and de Angelis was released and, after a lengthy wait for a helicopter, he was flown to hospital in Marseille where he died of smoke inhalation. This was an incident that led to the introduction of new safety standards for F1 tests but the sport had again lost one of its leading names. The Brabham team decided to run only Riccardo Patrese for the Belgian race.

Race 5: Belgium
The Belgian Grand Prix at Spa-Francorchamps saw a big surprise in qualifying as Gerhard Berger qualified his Benetton-BMW second behind Nelson Piquet's Williams-Honda. The powerful and aerodynamically efficient Benetton was able to show its true performance at Spa. Alain Prost was third in his McLaren ahead of World Championship leader Ayrton Senna. Nigel Mansell was fifth in his Williams-Honda with Teo Fabi (Benetton), Rene Arnoux (Ligier-Renault), Keke Rosberg (McLaren), Michele Alboreto (Ferrari) and Patrick Tambay (Lola-Ford) completing the top 10.

Piquet made a good start to take the lead to go into the lead while Berger was slow away and found was between Senna and Prost at the hairpin. Prost and Berger collided and there was chaos behind them. When the dust settled Tambay was out with a broken suspension but everyone else was still going, albeit with some damage. This meant that Piquet was clear of Senna with Mansell third, Stefan Johansson (Ferrari) fourth, Johnny Dumfries (Lotus) fifth and Jacques Laffite (Ligier) sixth. Mansell quickly overhauled Senna but on lap five he spun and was overtaken by Senna and Johansson. Dumfries spun off and so Alboreto moved to fifth having passed the Ligiers, Arnoux having overtaken Laffite. Arnoux's race would end soon afterwards with a blown engine. Soon afterwards Piquet disappeared with another engine failure and so Senna went into the lead with Mansell closing in. The pit stops resulted in Mansell getting ahead of Senna with Alboreto third and Johansson fourth. Senna closed in on Mansell but after a battle the Briton in his better-suited Williams-Honda pulled away to win. Senna was second while the two Ferraris battled for third, Johansson eventually coming out ahead of Alboreto. Laffite was fifth with Prost salvaging one point for sixth place, driving a chassis that according to McLaren technical director John Barnard was badly bent from the accident at La Source and had to be written off after the race.

Race 6: Canada
Before the Canadian Grand Prix at the public road Gilles Villeneuve circuit in Montreal, the death of Elio de Angelis a month earlier had created an opening at Brabham and the team hired Derek Warwick who had been left out of work after Ayrton Senna refused to have him as his Lotus teammate. Marc Surer was also missing having been very seriously injured while competing on the Hessen Rally in a Ford RS200 supercar; he never raced in Formula One again. Christian Danner was hired by Arrows but because of contractual problems had to race in Canada for Osella and so there was only one Arrows.

Qualifying resulted in pole position for Nigel Mansell's Williams-Honda with Ayrton Senna's Lotus-Renault right with him. Nelson Piquet was third in the second Williams while Alain Prost was fourth for McLaren ahead of Rene Arnoux (Ligier), Keke Rosberg (McLaren), Gerhard Berger (Benetton), Jacques Laffite (Ligier), Riccardo Patrese (Brabham) and Warwick. Michele Alboreto was 11th in his Ferrari. In the morning warm-up Patrick Tambay suffered a suspension failure on his Lola-Ford and injured his feet in the resulting accident and so he did not start. Mansell took the lead and with Senna holding up those behind him, Mansell seemed to be in a very strong position. Behind Senna were Prost, Piquet, Rosberg, Arnoux and the rest. Rosberg soon overtook Piquet. On the fifth lap Prost finally made it ahead of Senna and the Brazilian went wide and was pushed back to sixth behind Piquet and Arnoux. On lap 13 Rosberg overtook Prost for second and four laps later the Finn took the lead. His fuel consumption was too much., however, and so Rosberg had to back off which enabled Mansell and Prost to close up. As they came up to lap former world champion Alan Jones on lap 22 Rosberg left a small gap and Mansell took the lead again. Mansell pulled away to win the race, and Prost retook Rosberg for second place but he then had a slow pit stop caused by a sticking wheelnut and dropped back to fifth. He spent the rest of the race charging back to take second by the finish. Piquet was third with Rosberg fourth having had to slow to conserve fuel in the closing laps while the troubled Senna was fifth and Arnoux sixth.

Race 7: Detroit (USA)
Bernie Ecclestone had arranged a convoy to travel from Montreal to Detroit, which would take place a week after the Canadian Grand Prix. Detroit was the only 1986 Formula One Grand Prix in the United States; this unpopular race on a very bumpy, rough, tight and angular street circuit lined with unforgiving concrete walls in the middle of downtown Detroit was widely accepted as the toughest and most demanding Grand Prix of the year. With Patrick Tambay recovering from his leg injuries from Canada, the Beatrice Lola team hired Eddie Cheever for the weekend, while Christian Danner transferred from Osella to Arrows to replace the injured Marc Surer and so Canadian Allen Berg took over the second of the Italian cars. Qualifying resulted in another pole position for Senna in his Lotus-Renault, which had the best chassis and suspension and was able to deal with the bumps and roughness of Detroit better than any of the other cars. The two Williams-Hondas of Nigel Mansell and Nelson Piquet were second and third, Rene Arnoux was fourth in the Ligier-Renault ahead of Stefan Johansson's Ferrari and Jacques Laffite in the second Ligier. Then came Alain Prost's McLaren-TAG, Riccardo Patrese's Brabham-BMW, Keke Rosberg's McLaren and Cheever. As was usually the case in Detroit, it was hot and humid, and at the start Senna took the lead with Mansell second under pressure from Arnoux. On the second lap Senna missed a gear and Mansell went ahead, quickly leaving Senna to fight with Arnoux. Mansell was in trouble with brakes, however, and so Senna was soon able to catch him again and on the eighth lap Senna took the lead again. He was also on harder tires than Mansell so he was well placed for a victory. Mansell dropped back behind Arnoux and Laffite. On lap 12, however, Senna had a puncture and had to pit and so there was a Ligier 1–2 with Arnoux leading Laffite for a couple of laps before Jacques went ahead. Mansell was third with Prost fourth, Piquet fifth and Senna sixth. The pit stops got rid of the Ligiers as a competitive force, the team being much slower than the other front-runners and with Piquet and Mansell both slower than they should have been, Senna was ahead again when the stops were over. Piquet then crashed on the straight before the pits and the car was hit by Arnoux, who then tried to keep going and reversed into the path of Thierry Boutsen's Arrows. This left Senna a long way ahead of Prost with Laffite third and closing. Prost had a misfire and could do nothing to stop Laffite taking second before the finish. Fourth place went to Alboreto with Mansell fifth after he had been up an escape road and Patrese was sixth.

Race 8: France
Elio de Angelis's fatal accident had led the Paul Ricard authorities to shorten the circuit dramatically and it now cut through on the 2.3 mile (3.8 km) racing school circuit, which took out the high-speed esses where de Angelis had crashed and reduced the length of the Mistral Straight. Patrick Tambay was back in action with the Haas Lola team after missing the Detroit GP because of leg injuries from an accident in Canada. Tambay also had a new engineer, Adrian Newey having been hired from the March Indycar project. In the days before the race, FISA had also announced plans to introduce a new 3.5-liter normally-aspirated formula in 1989. Qualifying resulted in another pole position for Senna in his Lotus-Renault with the two Williams-Hondas of Mansell and Piquet second and third. Arnoux was fourth in the Ligier-Renault ahead of Prost's McLaren-TAG/Porsche. Then came Michele Alboreto's Ferrari, Keke Rosberg's McLaren, the Benetton-BMWs of Gerhard Berger and Teo Fabi and Johansson's Ferrari. At the start Alboreto stalled and was left behind while Mansell took the lead from Senna, Arnoux, Berger, Prost, a fast-starting Johnny Dumfries in the second Lotus, Piquet and Rosberg. Fabi collided with Warwick's Brabham during the first lap and both had to pit. On the fifth lap Senna went off at the very fast Signes corner on oil left by Andrea de Cesaris's exploding Minardi-Motori Moderni. The Lotus hit the barriers and Senna was out- which was the same place Senna had crashed at the French Grand Prix the year before. Mansell was left alone at the front with Arnoux second and Berger under pressure from both McLarens. They soon passed the Benetton while later ran into Christian Danner's Arrows and had to pit for repairs. Prost and Rosberg chased after Arnoux and were both ahead of the Ligier by lap 18. Mansell had two tire stops and Prost was briefly in the lead but with new rubber and no fuel problems, Mansell was able to retake the lead on lap 58 and went on to win the race. Prost was second. Piquet was struggling with electrical trouble all afternoon but managed to overtake Rosberg to finish third while the top six was completed by the two Ligiers of Arnoux and Laffite.

Race 9: Britain
There was a massive crowd at the British Grand Prix at the challenging Brands Hatch circuit just outside London, with many locals turning out hoping to see home favorite Mansell win. Jacques Laffite was due to equal Graham Hill's record of 176 Grand Prix starts and the popular Frenchman was hoping for a good performance at Brands Hatch as the Ligier-Renault had been very competitive. Williams celebrated the return of team boss Frank Williams to the F1 paddock for the first time since he was paralyzed in a road accident in March. There was considerable action on the engine front with Ligier announcing a three-year deal for 1987-88-89 with Alfa Romeo and Team Lotus negotiating for Honda engines. The entry was unchanged from the French GP and in qualifying the two Williams-Hondas were dominant with Nelson Piquet ahead of Nigel Mansell. Ayrton Senna was third in his Lotus-Renault ahead of Gerhard Berger (Benetton-BMW), the McLaren-TAGs of Keke Rosberg and Alain Prost, Teo Fabi's Benetton, Rene Arnoux's Ligier, Derek Warwick's Brabham and Johnny Dumfries in the second Lotus. Laffite had a bad qualifying and was 19th. At the start Mansell's Williams failed as he went into Paddock Hill Bend. He was fortunate however because moments later the race was stopped following a multiple crash behind him. This was caused by Thierry Boutsen losing control of his Arrows in the midfield. This bounced off the wall into the backmarkers and Stefan Johansson jinked right to avoid it. Unfortunately Laffite was alongside him and the Ligier had to swerve and went head-on into the barrier. Back on the track Boutsen was hit by Piercarlo Ghinzani (Osella) and by Christian Danner (Arrows) and the accident also involved the two Minardis, the two Zakspeeds and Allen Berg's Osella. Laffite was cut from the wreckage of his car and then flown to hospital but with both legs broken at the age of 42, his Formula 1 career was over. It took nearly an hour and a half before the race was restarted and Mansell (in the spare car) followed Piquet into the first corner with Berger getting ahead of the second Williams in the course of the first lap. Mansell soon retook the Benetton and went after Piquet. Senna was fourth under pressure from Rosberg but the Finn went out soon afterwards with a gearbox failure and so Prost was fifth ahead of Alboreto. Prost pitted early for new tires (his original set having been out of balance) and he dropped back while Berger went out on lap 23 with electrical trouble. On the same lap Piquet missed a gear and Mansell went ahead, to the delight of the British fans. Soon afterwards the third-placed Senna went into the pits to retire with a gearbox problem. The Williams-Hondas battled for the rest of the afternoon but Mansell stayed ahead to win. Arnoux had run third early on but a bad choice of tires meant he had to stop twice and so Prost took the position with Arnoux fourth ahead of the two Tyrrells of Martin Brundle and Philippe Streiff, the Frenchman overtaking Warwick on the last lap as the Englishman had to conserve fuel. This was the last Formula One Grand Prix at Brands Hatch; from 1987 onwards the British Grand Prix would be held at Silverstone.

Race 10: Germany
Jacques Laffite's accident at Brands Hatch meant that Ligier needed a new driver and Philippe Alliot was hired to replace him for the German Grand Prix at the very fast and forested Hockenheim circuit. Team Lotus announced that it would be using Honda engines in 1987 with Ayrton Senna being joined by Satoru Nakajima. Arrows had the new A9 chassis for the first time while Keke Rosberg announced that he would be retiring from Formula One at the end of the season and then took pole position for McLaren, ahead of his teammate Alain Prost, the team having benefited from the arrival of new turbochargers. Ayrton Senna was third with Gerhard Berger fourth for Benetton with Nelson Piquet and Nigel Mansell next in their Williams-Hondas. The top 10 was completed by Riccardo Patrese (Brabham-BMW), Rene Arnoux (Ligier-Renault), Teo Fabi (Benetton) and Michele Alboreto's Ferrari. At the start Senna took the lead as the two McLaren-TAGs were slightly slower off the line. This enabled Berger to grab second from Rosberg and Piquet to get ahead of Prost. Further back Alliot made a good start but then knocked Stefan Johansson into a spin, collecting Fabi's Benetton as it went. Johansson and Alliot both pitted at the end of the lap. Rosberg soon took the lead from Senna and Berger was overtaken by Piquet and it was not long before Piquet was ahead of Senna as well. Berger pitted on lap five with an engine problem. While this was going on Piquet closed on Rosberg and took the lead on lap six. Prost was ahead of Senna with Arnoux fifth and Mansell sixth, complaining of poor handling. Things were so bad that Nigel was overtaken by Alboreto and only regained sixth when the Ferrari went out with transmission failure on lap seven. Piquet decided to go for two stops and so pitted early leaving the McLarens running 1–2 ahead of Senna but when they pitted Piquet went ahead again and although he dropped behind them again when he stopped again he was able to overtake both by the finish. On the penultimate lap both McLarens ran out of fuel and so Senna took second place with Mansell third, Arnoux fourth and Rosberg and Prost being classified fifth and sixth.

Race 11: Hungary
The World Championship headed behind the Iron Curtain for the first time to the new Hungaroring, outside Budapest, and there was an enthusiastic welcome for the Formula 1 circus. The very modern track was rather twisty and overtaking would be difficult. Traffic was a problem in qualifying but as usual Ayrton Senna was on pole in his Lotus-Renault with Nelson Piquet second in the Williams-Honda ahead of Alain Prost (McLaren-TAG), World Championship leader Nigel Mansell (Williams-Honda) and Keke Rosberg in the second McLaren. The top 10 was completed by Patrick Tambay in the Lola-Ford, Stefan Johansson's Ferrari, Johnny Dumfries in the second Lotus, Rene Arnoux's Ligier and Alan Jones's Lola. There was a vast crowd, estimated to be more than 200,000 on race day and at the start Senna went into the lead while Mansell blasted ahead of Prost and Piquet to grab second place. Piquet soon showed that he was very competitive by passing Mansell for second. Tambay had started well and overtook Prost on the first lap but he was soon repassed by the McLaren and by his teammate Jones. On lap 11 Prost moved ahead of Mansell and a lap later Piquet took the lead from Senna, who fell back towards Prost's McLaren. Alain soon pitted with an electrical problem and this upset Rosberg's race as he pitted for tires at the same time and had to be waved through. McLaren ceased to be a force. This meant that Mansell was third with Dumfries fourth and Berger fifth. In the middle of the race Piquet pitted for tires while Senna stayed out and charged hard and so that when he pitted he was able to rejoin in the lead. The gap came quickly down and Piquet went ahead again and the two cars then ran close together all the way to the finish but Piquet stayed ahead with Senna settling for second and Mansell third. Johansson claimed fourth with Dumfries fifth and Martin Brundle sixth in his Tyrrell. The result meant that there were four men covered by 11 points in the World Championship race: Mansell, Senna, Piquet and Prost.

Race 12: Austria
A week after Hungary, the teams were in action again at the fastest circuit of the year, the scenic and spectacular Österreichring in Austria and it was a surprise to see the two Benetton-BMWs on the front row with Fabi two-tenths faster than home favorite Berger; these cars were not only the most powerful cars on the grid with the Brabhams and Arrows cars but also along with the Williams and McLarens among the most aerodynamically efficient cars. Rosberg was third quickest in his McLaren-TAG/Porsche but the good performance from BMW was highlighted by Riccardo Patrese's fourth place for Brabham. Prost was fifth in his McLaren and then came the regular front-runners and World Championship contenders Mansell and Piquet in their Williams-Hondas and Senna in his Lotus-Renault. The top 10 was completed by Michele Alboreto's Ferrari and Derek Warwick's Brabham. Brabham had problems in the warm-up and so Warwick had to hand over his car to Patrese and the Briton was not able to take the start. At the start Berger took the lead from Fabi, Prost, Mansell, Piquet, Rosberg and Senna. The Benettons were highly competitive and pulled quickly away from the field while Senna soon disappeared with electrical trouble. On lap 17 Fabi went into the lead only to have his engine fail and so Berger went ahead again. Prost stopped for new tires and so Mansell moved to second. This became the lead a few minutes later when Berger pitted with an electrical problem. Mansell pitted and so Prost went into the lead while Piquet disappeared with an engine problem. Almost immediately Mansell too went out with a broken driveshaft. This left Prost by himself at the front with the two Ferraris running second and third, with Alboreto ahead of Stefan Johansson. The two Haas Lolas were fourth and fifth with Alan Jones ahead of Patrick Tambay while the final point went to Christian Danner's Arrows.

Race 13: Italy
The big news at the Monza Autodrome near Milan was that McLaren designer John Barnard was leaving to join the Ferrari team. The new AGS was in the paddock for the first time with Ivan Capelli driving the Motori Moderni-engined chassis (which was, in fact, an old Renault Sport one with AGS bodywork). This had previously been tested by Didier Pironi. Michele Alboreto was in difficulties having crashed a motorcycle and injured his shoulder. The Osella team had replaced Allen Berg with local rising star Alex Caffi but otherwise the field was as normal. Qualifying resulted in the Teo Fabi taking pole in his Benetton with Alain Prost second for McLaren ahead of Mansell's Williams, Berger's Benetton, Senna's Lotus and the second Williams of Piquet. The top 10 was completed by Derek Warwick (Brabham-BMW), Keke Rosberg (McLaren), Alboreto and Riccardo Patrese (Brabham). Before the start Fabi and Prost both had trouble and while Fabi had to start from the back of the grid, Prost went to his spare car in the pitlane. As a result, the front row was gone and this enabled Berger to take the lead from Mansell on the run down to the first corner. Senna suffered an immediate transmission failure and retired. The result of all of this was that Berger led Mansell, Piquet, a fast-starting Rene Arnoux (Ligier), Rosberg and Alboreto. In the early laps Alboreto moved ahead of Arnoux and the front four then began to pull away from the rest of the field. At the end of the seventh lap Mansell went into the lead and he was followed through by Piquet and Alboreto as Berger backed off to conserve fuel. In the meantime Prost and Fabi were charging up through the field, Prost getting to sixth by lap 18. The McLaren was then black-flagged for an illegal switch of cars. It mattered little because his TAG engine blew soon afterwards. During the tires stops Alboreto spun and glanced a barrier and had to stop for repairs. This dropped the Ferrari out of the battle for the lead. Piquet now charged up to Mansell and took the lead, pulling away to win a dominant victory and moved himself back to second in the World Championship. Mansell's second place meant that he was still five points ahead. Johansson finished third with Rosberg fourth, Berger fifth and Alan Jones sixth in the Haas Lola.

Race 14: Portugal
The Portuguese Grand Prix at the Estoril Autodrome near Lisbon was moved to September instead of being held in April. The field was as it had been at Monza except that Allen Berg was back in the second Osella after the car had been driven by Alex Caffi in Italy. Pirelli announced that it was withdrawing from Grand Prix racing at the end of the year and Renault said that it too had decided not to continue supplying F1 engines for the 1987 season. Ferrari had also announced that it had signed up Gerhard Berger to replace Stefan Johansson. Qualifying resulted in another pole position for Ayrton Senna's Lotus-Renault while Nigel Mansell was second fastest in his Williams-Honda with Alain Prost third for McLaren and Berger fourth in his Benetton. Then came Fabi, Piquet, Rosberg, Johansson, Patrese, and Arnoux. At the start Mansell went into the lead and he remained there for the rest of the afternoon to win an impressive victory. Senna followed him and only dropped from second when he stopped for tires in the mid-race. On the last lap, however, he started to run out of fuel and dropped from second to fourth, promoting Prost to second and Piquet to third. The two Ferraris of Johansson and Michele Alboreto picked up fifth and sixth.

Race 15: Mexico
It had been 16 years since the last Mexican GP (the country that hosted the football World Cup earlier that year) and the same circuit, now called the Rodriguez Brothers Autodrome in the heart of Mexico City had been completely rebuilt was a shorter circuit than the original but despite resurfacing work it was very bumpy, thanks to Mexico City's geologically active surface. The circuit was located 7,380 feet above sea level- even higher than the Kyalami circuit in South Africa, of which this event was replacing. The only change from the field at the Portuguese GP was that AGS had not made the trip to Mexico. Qualifying was a familiar story with Senna on pole in his JPS Lotus-Renault. Then came Nelson Piquet and Nigel Mansell in their Williams-Hondas with Gerhard Berger fourth in his Benetton-BMW. Next up was Riccardo Patrese (Brabham-BMW) ahead of Alain Prost (McLaren-TAG/Porsche), Derek Warwick in the second Brabham, Patrick Tambay in the Haas Lola, Teo Fabi's Benetton and Philippe Alliot in the Ligier-Renault. The Ferraris were not competitive. Mansell was in the position to win the World Championship if he could score a good result but at the start he made a mess of it and was left at the back of the field. Piquet and Senna were running first and second. Berger was third with Prost fourth. On the seventh lap Prost got ahead of Berger. Mansell charged up through the backmarkers but then had to pit for new tires. The only man not to do so was Berger, who reckoned that he might be able to go the distance on his Pirelli tires. When the other front-runners returned to action they were not able to close on Berger because the Goodyears were blistering in the heat. Piquet had led comfortably until a suspension issue cost him several seconds per lap, and forced 3 pitstops in the last few laps, dropping him from the lead to 4th.

Berger thus took his first Formula 1 victory, followed home by Prost and Senna. Piquet and Mansell were fourth and fifth - Mansell had caught right up to Piquet but was unable to pass his team-mate, who needed the points to retain a mathematical chance of the championship himself, and set the fastest lap of the race in response to Mansell's challenge: while the final point went to Alliot. As the F1 circus headed off to Australia Mansell was still in a dominant position in the World Championship six points clear of Prost and seven ahead of Piquet.

Race 16: Australia
The most dramatic and exciting race of the 1980s, the 1986 race in Adelaide saw the showdown of a three-way fight for the World Championship between Nigel Mansell, Alain Prost and Nelson Piquet. Mansell had 70 points, six more than Prost and seven more than Piquet. Prost's McLaren-TAG was no match for the Williams-Hondas – which had lapped the Frenchman at several races – although Alain had collected points all year while the Williams pair fought one another. Mansell was on pole ahead of Piquet and Ayrton Senna (Lotus-Renault). Prost was fourth followed by Rene Arnoux (Ligier), Gerhard Berger (Benetton), Keke Rosberg (McLaren), Philippe Alliot (Ligier), Michele Alboreto's Ferrari and Philippe Streiff's Tyrrell.

At the second corner of the race, Senna forced his way into the lead. Piquet and Rosberg followed him past Mansell and on that first lap Piquet overtook Senna to take the lead. On the next lap Senna dropped behind Rosberg and on lap 4 behind Mansell. Two laps later Prost was also ahead of Senna.

On lap 7 Rosberg overtook Piquet and began to build a lead while a little later Prost got ahead of Mansell and chased after Piquet. On lap 23 Nelson spun. Prost's hopes seemed to evaporate a few laps later when he had a puncture and had to pit. He was back in fourth again.
Piquet charged back from his spin, passing Mansell for second place on lap 44 but Prost closed on his two Williams driver and with 25 laps to go all three were running together.

On lap 63 the battle became one for the lead, when Rosberg suffered a right rear tire failure. Mansell was on course for the title when two laps later on the Dequetteville Terrace (Brabham Straight) his left rear tire exploded at 180 mph. Nigel managed to avoid hitting anything, but his championship hopes were over. Williams had no choice but to call Piquet to the pits and so Prost went into the lead.

Piquet closed the gap from fifteen seconds to four but Prost won the race and the World Championship after a breathtakingly exciting race. Third place in the race went to Stefan Johansson in his last race for Ferrari with Martin Brundle fourth in his Tyrrell. Streiff was fifth and Johnny Dumfries (Lotus) sixth.

In SKY TV's "Tales from the crypt" Mansell said that at the end of year FIA Paris prizegiving, Bertie Martin, the Clerk of the Course at Adelaide, told him that had he hit the wall and debris covered the track, he would have red-flagged the race and as two thirds race distance had been completed Mansell would have been world champion.

Results and standings

Grands Prix
The 1986 Formula One World Championship was contested over a sixteen-race series.

World Drivers' Championship standings

Drivers' Championship points were awarded on a 9–6–4–3–2–1 basis to the top six finishers in each round. Only the best eleven results counted towards each driver's championship total; discarded results are displayed within parentheses.

 Driver did not finish the Grand Prix, but was classified as he completed over 90% of the race distance.

World Constructors' Championship standings
Manufacturers' Championship points were awarded on a 9–6–4–3–2–1 basis to the top six finishers in each round.

 Car did not finish the Grand Prix, but was classified as it completed over 90% of the race distance.

Notes and references

External links
 
 1986 Formula 1 review
 1986 Formula 1 results & images at f1-facts.com

Formula One seasons